Kipra Gap (‘Sedlovina Kipra’ \se-dlo-vi-'na 'ki-pra\) is the 2 km long, ice-covered pass of elevation 1550 m in northern Sentinel Range, Ellsworth Mountains in Antarctica connecting Mount Weems on the north to Gromshin Heights on the south.

The saddle is named after the settlement of Kipra in Northeastern Bulgaria.

Location
US mapping in 1961.

Maps
 Newcomer Glacier.  Scale 1:250 000 topographic map.  Reston, Virginia: US Geological Survey, 1961.
 Antarctic Digital Database (ADD). Scale 1:250000 topographic map of Antarctica. Scientific Committee on Antarctic Research (SCAR). Since 1993, regularly updated.

Notes

References
 Kipra Gap. SCAR Composite Gazetteer of Antarctica.
 Bulgarian Antarctic Gazetteer. Antarctic Place-names Commission. (details in Bulgarian, basic data in English)

External links
 Kipra Gap. Copernix satellite image

Ellsworth Mountains
Bulgaria and the Antarctic
Mountain passes of Ellsworth Land